Rachel Carson Prize may refer to any of three prizes and awards named after environmentalist Rachel Carson:

 Rachel Carson Prize (academic book prize), an American academic book prize 
 Rachel Carson Prize (environmentalist award), a Norwegian prize for female environmentalists
 Rachel Carson Award, an award honoring women environmentalists